Eric Otieno (born 20 January 1956) is a Kenyan field hockey player. He competed at the 1984 Summer Olympics in Los Angeles, where the Kenyan team placed ninth.

References

External links

1956 births
Living people
Kenyan male field hockey players
Olympic field hockey players of Kenya
Field hockey players at the 1984 Summer Olympics
Place of birth missing (living people)